Long Lake Helms Seaplane Base  is a privately owned, public use seaplane based on Long Lake in the Town of Long Lake, Hamilton County, New York, United States.

Facilities and aircraft 
Long Lake Helms Seaplane Base resides at elevation of 1,629 feet (497 m) above mean sea level. It has one seaplane landing area designated NE/SW with a water surface measuring 15,000 by 1,500 feet (4,572 x 457 m).

For the 12-month period ending September 15, 2011, the airport had 2,200 aircraft operations, an average of 183 per month: 54.5% general aviation and 45.5% air taxi. At that time there were three single-engine aircraft based at this airport.

See also 
 Long Lake Sagamore Seaplane Base (FAA: K03) located at

References

External links 

 

Airports in New York (state)
Seaplane bases in the United States
Transportation in Hamilton County, New York
Adirondacks